The annual International Conference on Digital Audio Effects or DAFx Conference is a meeting of enthusiasts working in research areas on audio signal processing, acoustics, and music related disciplines, who come together to present and discuss their findings. The conference evolved from an EU-COST-G6 project “Digital Audio Effects” in 1998.

The acronym DAFx stands for Digital Audio Effects and is also the name of a book
which was written by people in the community around the conference

A list of past and upcoming conferences together with an archive of all proceedings can be found at the website.

Scheduled and past conferences
 DAFX, 2020 - Vienna, Austria
 DAFX, 2019 - Birmingham, UK
 DAFX, 2018 - Aveiro, Portugal
 DAFX, 2017 - Edinburgh, UK
DAFX, 2016 - Brno, Czech Republic
DAFX, 2015 - Trondheim, Norway
DAFX, 2014 - Erlangen, Germany
DAFX, 2013 - Maynooth, Ireland
DAFX, 2012 - York, UK
DAFX, 2011 - Paris, France
DAFX, 2010 - Graz, Austria
DAFX, 2009 - Como, Italy
DAFX, 2008 - Espoo, Finland
DAFX, 2007 - Bordeaux, France
DAFX, 2006 - Montreal, Quebec, Canada
 DAFX, 2005 - Madrid, Spain
 DAFX, 2004 - Naples, Italy
DAFX, 2003 - London, UK
DAFX, 2002 - Hamburg, Germany
DAFX, 2001 - Limerick, Ireland
 DAFX, 2000 - Verona, Italy
 DAFX, 1999 - Trondheim, Norway
 DAFX, 1998 - Barcelona, Spain

See also
International Society for Music Information Retrieval
Sound and Music Computing Conference

References

Audio effects
Audio engineering
Computer science conferences
Information science
Music conferences
Recurring events established in 1998